Fast Fiction was a market stall, magazine, mail order distributor and news sheet that played a key role in the history of British small press comics. It existed in its various forms from 1981 through to 1990 under the stewardship of Paul Gravett, Phil Elliott and Ed Pinsent.

The name was taken from a Classics Illustrated knock-off spotted in the Overstreet Comic Book Price Guide.

History
Paul Gravett started the Fast Fiction stall at the bimonthly Westminster Comics Mart in London, England, in 1981, selling imported European comics, or bande dessinée. Having discovered that interesting new comics were being published in short-run photocopy form he contacted the creators and offered to sell their comics on his stall and through mail order. Initially, this was done for free with a small percentage cut being introduced later. The Fast Fiction stall became the de facto social centre for small press publishers along with the adjoining pub, The Westminster Arms.

Cartoonist Phil Elliott and Ian Wieczorek took over Fast Fiction in late 1981 when Gravett started working for Pssst!, magazine leading to him launching Escape Magazine. The bimonthly stall and mail-order distributor continued along with a regular information sheet listing titles available to order, and a new anthology featuring cartoonists they sold. This was also called Fast Fiction, debuting in 1982 with a print run of 100 copies, and lasting until 1991, with issues #29 and #30 reviewed in Zum! #1.  Ed Pinsent, another cartoonist who had been involved in the cassette culture music trading scene, subsequently took over from Elliott and continued to run things until 1990.

Following the closure of Fast Fiction their mailing list was passed on to Luke Walsh (later known as Luke Temple Walsh) and Mike Kidson who used it to launch the small press comics review zine Zum!.

See also

British small press comics
Escape Magazine

References

Campbell, Eddie (2001) Alec: How To Be An Artist. Eddie Campbell Comics. .
Gravett, Paul (2003) "The Great Escape" The Comics Journal Special Edition 3 46-61
Huxley, David (2001) Nasty Tales: Sex, Drugs, Rock'n'Roll and Violence in the British Underground Headpress 

British comics
Defunct British comics
British small press comics
Distribution companies of the United Kingdom